Ambulance is a 2022 American action thriller film directed and co-produced by Michael Bay and written by Chris Fedak. A co-production between New Republic Pictures, Project X Entertainment and Bay Films, it is based on the 2005 Danish film of the same name by Laurits Munch-Petersen and Lars Andreas Pedersen. It stars Jake Gyllenhaal, Yahya Abdul-Mateen II, and Eiza González and follows two adoptive siblings (Gyllenhaal and Abdul-Mateen) turned bank robbers who hijack an ambulance and take two first responders hostage.

The film was first announced in 2015 and went through several crew changes. In 2020, Bay came on board to direct after the COVID-19 pandemic disrupted his plans to shoot a different movie. Filming took place in Los Angeles, in the midst of the pandemic with cinematographer Roberto De Angelis. During post-production, the film was edited by Pietro Scalia and the score was composed by Lorne Balfe.

Ambulance was theatrically released in some international territories on March 16, and then premiered in Paris, France, on March 20, and was theatrically released in the United States by Universal Pictures on April 8, 2022. The film underperformed at the box office, grossing approximately $52 million worldwide on a budget of $40 million. While the story drew some criticism, the film received praise for Bay's direction and the action sequences.

Plot
Former Marine and Afghanistan veteran Will Sharp is desperately in need of $231,000 for his wife Amy's experimental cancer surgery. He reaches out to Danny, his adoptive brother and a life-long criminal, who talks him into taking part in a $32 million bank heist. Though initially hesitant, Will agrees after Danny reaffirms that he is doing this for Amy. The plan nearly succeeds until Officer Zach Parker, who goes to the bank to ask out a bank teller, discovers the situation and is held hostage by Danny. A shootout occurs between one of the heist members and Zach's partner Officer Mark. The Special Investigation Section (SIS) of the LAPD arrives, killing or arresting the whole crew except Will and Danny, who retreat towards the garage. Zach attempts to escape and during a scuffle between him and Danny, he is accidentally shot by Will. Leaving Zach to die, the brothers attempt to exit through the back of the building but find it surrounded by police. They hijack a Falck ambulance with paramedic Cam Thompson on board, who is treating the injured Zach. After a chase that leads them into an alleyway, Cam makes a desperate attempt to escape using a fire extinguisher, but is quickly recaptured by Danny as Zach starts flatlining.

SIS Captain Monroe arrives on the scene and deploys helicopters to chase after the ambulance. Cam gets Danny to help her use a defibrillator and Will to transfer some of his blood to Zach, much to his confusion and frustration. Danny calls Papi, one of his adoptive father's criminal friends, for help losing the police in exchange for $8 million. When Cam stops Danny from shooting Mark, who has been chasing them, Danny threatens to throw her off the ambulance. The police are forced to retreat when it is discovered that Monroe's dog Nitro is inside Mark's police vehicle. FBI Agent Anson Clark, a past friend of Danny's, is put on the case.

As Zach begins to bleed out, Cam, with Will's assistance, begins to perform surgery on Zach, whose spleen ruptures. Despite her inexperience, Cam successfully performs the surgery. Cam tries to convince Will to stop Danny, to no avail. Monroe, unaware of the surgery's success, moves forward with the operation and prepares to snipe Will and Danny without negotiating for Cam's life. Clark calls Cam and tells her to get down. Cam, wanting to save Zach's life, alerts Will and Danny about the snipers. Danny, having had enough of Cam, decides to shoot her, but Will intervenes, causing the brothers to scuffle. They reconcile and listen to music together ("Sailing" by Christopher Cross) to ease the tension.

In the Los Angeles River, helicopters chase the ambulance as Danny shoots at them. Will and Danny drive on the opposite lane of the interstate, creating multiple accidents. On Papi's orders, his son Roberto drives an empty ambulance towards the police after filling it with C-4 explosives and deploys machine guns on separate cars to cause additional damage, which ends up wounding Monroe in the crossfire. Mark chases down Roberto and accidentally makes him shoot himself after a scuffle, leaving Papi angry and distraught. Will and Danny escape to Papi's hideout, where Papi demands the brothers to leave Zach and Cam with them to deal with; Will refuses to cooperate and teams up with Danny to kill Papi and his crew. In the chaos, Cam accidentally shoots Will using Zach's gun, mistaking him for one of the gang members. This also gives away the police who chase them once more as they escape.

Danny takes the ambulance to a hospital while Cam tries to save an accidentally injured Will just as police forces surround them as they enter. As Cam tries to save Will's life, Danny discovers Zach's gun and becomes enraged when Cam reveals that she was the one who shot Will. As Anson orders Danny to turn himself in or be shot, Danny vows to kill Cam along with himself on live television, before confronting Anson and the rest of the police. Will, left with no other choice, shoots Danny in the back before the police arrest him and handcuff him to the ground next to a wounded Danny while Cam is safely rescued. Danny apologizes to Will for his actions before he dies from his injuries just as Amy and her baby son arrive, having realized about her husband's actions on going on a heist so he can pay for her cancer treatment. As Will is taken inside for surgery while handcuffed, Cam secretly gives some of the heist money to Amy for her surgery, and Zach, when questioned by the police about his injuries, tells them that Will saved his life. Cam then visits Lindsey, a girl that she rescued from a car accident earlier and holds her hand as she wakes up recovered from her injuries, before leaving the hospital.

Cast

Production

Development
Ambulance is an American remake of the 2005 Danish film of the same name. Producer Bradley J. Fischer said Michael Bay was his first choice to direct the film but that the filmmaker had originally passed on the project. The film was announced on August 28, 2015, with Phillip Noyce attached to direct from a script written by Chris Fedak. Two years later, it was reported that Noyce had been replaced by directing duo Navot Papushado and Aharon Keshales, but this version of the film never entered production.

In 2020, the COVID-19 pandemic in Los Angeles preempted Bay's plans to shoot his next film, Black Five. He recalled telling his agent "Goddamnit, I just want to get out and shoot something fast. I'm tired of being locked up at home." He pitched an idea to Donna Langley, the Chairwoman of Universal Pictures, and said he wanted to direct a "small" film focusing on the tension between characters trapped in a claustrophobic setting. Bay was reminded of Ambulance and told that the film could be shot on a relatively low-budget in a short period of time. "It kind of suited my needs," he said. On November 11, 2020, Bay was announced as the new director, and the film was referred to as a "character-driven project" that would move away from Bay's normality of "standard explosion-heavy fare" while using elements from Speed (1994) and Bad Boys (1995). Bay did not watch or read the screenplay of the original Danish film because he wanted to make the film his own.

The film was financed by Endeavor Content and produced by New Republic Pictures and Project X. Jake Gyllenhaal received the screenplay while shooting a different project in October 2020. The following month, the film was announced with Gyllenhaal and Dylan O'Brien in talks to star as the two adoptive brothers who hijack the ambulance and Eiza González in negotiations to star as the paramedic. Gyllenhaal's casting was a contributing factor in Bay's decision to shoot the film. To prepare for the role, González spent three months "working intimately with firefighters, EMTs, surgeons, [and] everyone around the medical care system." She also rented an ambulance and had a friend drive her around to improve her balance. On December 11, 2020, Universal Pictures confirmed they would distribute the film and announced O'Brien had dropped out of the project due to scheduling conflicts; Yahya Abdul-Mateen II was cast as his replacement when he was able to fit the film into his schedule, following a production delay on Aquaman and the Lost Kingdom (2023). González was confirmed to star three days later. The rest of the cast was announced between January and May 2021. On joining the cast, A Martinez said he submitted a self-made audition video from Auckland, New Zealand.

Filming
The film was shot on a $40 million budget in downtown Los Angeles. Filming wrapped after thirty-eight days.

During pre-production, stunt coordinator Mike Gunther put the three leads of the film through stunt driving courses to test their driving abilities. Supervising location manager Rob Gibson obtained driving permits for a large number of city streets and freeway corridors in the city using his close relationship with FilmLA. The cast and crew had to follow safety protocols such as wearing masks on set due to the COVID-19 pandemic. The production borrowed a total of six ambulances from Falck. The scenes inside of the ambulance were captured using three ambulances: one was driven with the crew on board; a second could be dismantled; and a third was rocked on a stage. According to Abdul-Mateen, the limited space inside of the ambulance required Gyllenhaal to hold the camera for a couple of takes.

Several Komodo digital cameras by Red were utilized for the shoot. A considerable amount of the film was shot using First Person View drones by LightCraft. Bay said this way of filming was implemented because he was inspired by Steven Spielberg's direction on War of the Worlds (2005) to come up with new ways to put his stories on screen while simultaneously limiting himself as a director. Executive producer Michael Kase discovered LightCraft after seeing their footage of the top of the Wilshire Grand Center. The drones in the film were flown by Drone Racing League pilots Jordan Temkin and Alex Vanover using head-mounted displays. Footage captured by the drones included scenes in the Los Angeles Convention Center and the city's Fashion District. To make the film feel authentic, the cast was allowed to improvise some of their lines. The production also hired real trauma surgeons, firefighters, SWAT teams, snipers, undercover SIS members, and 52 LAPD officers for the shoot.

On the first day of filming, while shooting footage of the ambulance driving on a freeway, Bay noticed several patrol officers and three motorcycle cops. He asked them if they wanted to star, to which they agreed, and used the opportunity to sweet talk the officers into creating a rolling roadblock, allowing them to close the freeway for free instead of paying the average $350–400,000 cost. On Garret Dillahunt's first day on set, the crew was able to secure access to an area that featured the Los Angeles City Hall, the Times Mirror Square building, and the LAPD headquarters for a mere 19 minutes worth of natural light to film. To describe the gravity of the situation, Bay was told that would be "the only time [and] the last time you are ever going to get this corner, this area." As the time started, Bay realized he had to spend some time fitting the English Mastiff in the film, which was his own dog, into a small vehicle. He would go on to describe it as the most difficult day on set.

The helicopter chase sequence in the Los Angeles River was not in the script; Bay came up with the idea over the weekend after two helicopters became available for use. The scene was shot in two and a half hours with the help of helicopter pilot Fred North. Instead of hiring stuntmen for the sequence, Gyllenhaal was actually hanging off the side of the ambulance's door and shooting at the helicopters himself while Abdul-Mateen was driving. Surprised by the sudden and speedy filming of the scene, Abdul-Mateen live-streamed the event to his friend as he was driving and later told Bay it was the "craziest shit I've ever done". Bay also took responsibility for a video shared on his Instagram of a stunt involving the ambulance crashing into several vehicles. The clip was criticized by the mayor and the governor of Los Angeles and censored on Instagram. He explained the logistics behind the stunt and how it was filmed in an interview with Collider and said it was "perfectly planned". Elaborating on the filming process, Bay said they shot "90 shots to 120 shots a day. That's a lot of shots. Most movies are 20 to 30 shots a day. But you know I was there with the camera. I'm a director who doesn't have a video village, I don't have a director's chair, I don't have a trailer. I'm right there with the actors and we work fast".

Post-production
Lorne Balfe composed the musical score; he previously collaborated with Bay on 13 Hours: The Secret Soldiers of Benghazi (2016) and 6 Underground (2019). The score was recorded in London's Abbey Road Studios, and released on April 8, 2022, by Back Lot Music. Editing was completed by Pietro Scalia. Due to the film's budget, Bay said he was not happy with some of the visual effects in the film: "There's not a lot of CGI. And you know, some of the CGI is shit in this movie." In a separate interview, he added, "I don't use CGI much. On Ambulance there's very little CGI on it. It's all real crashes ... If you're using CGI, it needs to be realistic."

Release

Ambulance premiered at the UGC Normandie in Paris, France, on March 20, 2022. It also had screening events in Berlin on March 22, London on March 23, Spain on March 24, Los Angeles at the Academy Museum of Motion Pictures on April 4, and Miami on April 5. The Los Angeles event was attended by Jason Momoa, who went out to support Abdul-Mateen, his Aquaman co-star.

The film was released in the United States by Universal Pictures on April 8, 2022. It was originally set to be released on February 18, 2022, coinciding with the release of Uncharted, but was moved forward after Sony postponed Bullet Train from April 8 to July 15, leaving the time slot open for another film. As a result of the Russian invasion of Ukraine, Universal "paused" the theatrical release of the film in Russia. The film was released digitally and on video-on-demand on May 23, 2022.

Marketing
The first trailer was shown at CinemaCon on August 25, 2021, and released online on October 21, 2021. It featured a cover of the song "California Dreamin'" sung by Bobby Womack. The Hollywood Reporter compared the footage to Heat (1995) and Training Day (2001), and Deadline Hollywood noted "the rapid rhythm that Bay does best." Entertainment Weekly said the film looked like "pure chaos, thanks to a lot of quick camera cuts, loads of gunfire, a high-speed ambulance chase, and Jake  doing the absolute most with his bank robber character." A second trailer was released on March 24, 2022. It featured the song "Sailing" by Christopher Cross. Entertainment Weekly wrote, "The latest trailer for the chaotic heist-gone-wrong film is peak Michael Bay, with everything you could possibly want from an action flick".

The film was marketed as a counterprogramming option for older male moviegoers. Pre-sales for the film trended ahead of Lionsgate's Moonfall (2022), which had a larger budget. Shawn Robbins from Boxoffice Pro said Universal had "done a fine job reaching its target male audience with significant promotion during major sporting events over the past few months." According to iSpot, Universal spent $33 million on television spots promoting the film, which generated 819 million impressions across the United States. Commercials were generally aired during sporting events such as NFL and NBA games, men's college basketball, Super Bowl LVI and the Winter Olympics, as well as re-runs of The Big Bang Theory.

Reception

Box office
Ambulance grossed $22.3 million in the United States and Canada, and $29.7 million in other territories, for a worldwide total of $52 million.

In the US and Canada, Ambulance was released alongside Sonic the Hedgehog 2 and the wide expansion of Everything Everywhere All at Once. It was projected to gross $8–14 million from 3,412 theaters in its opening weekend. Varietys Rebecca Rubin believed the "comparatively lean production budget ... could soften the blow in the event the film doesn't connect with audiences." The film made $3.2 million on its first day, including $700,000 from Thursday night previews. It went on to gross $8.7 million in its opening weekend, finishing fourth at the box office. Men made up 62% of the audience during its opening, with those above the age of 25 comprising 77% of ticket sales and those above 35 comprising 49%. The ethnic breakdown of the audience showed that 38% were Caucasian, 29% Hispanic and Latino Americans, 22% African American, and 11% Asian or other. Deadline Hollywoods Anthony D'Alessandro noted the reluctance of older male audiences to return to theaters and said, "when it comes to action films in today's cinemas, it's the superhero films that have it all, everything else is B-rated. They've stolen the air away from something as standard as Ambulance." The film made $4.1 million in its second weekend, $1.8 million in its third, and $1.2 million in its fourth before dropping out of the box office top ten. Rubin deemed the film a box-office bomb, citing its release in a crowded marketplace, lukewarm reviews, the effects of the COVID-19 pandemic on moviegoing habits, and the action genre's steady decline in popularity.

Outside the US and Canada, the film earned $4.4 million from 35 international markets in its opening weekend. It made $6.6 million in its second weekend, $2.8 million in its fourth, $1.4 million in its fifth, $1.8 million in its sixth, and $572,000 in its seventh.

Critical response
On the review aggregator website Rotten Tomatoes, 68% of 248 critics gave the film a positive review, with an average rating of 5.8/10. The website's critical consensus reads, "At top speed and with sirens wailing, Ambulance comes riding to the rescue for audiences facing an emergency shortage of Michael Bay action thrills." It is the second highest-rated film directed by Bay on the site, as well as the second to hold a "fresh" rating, alongside The Rock (1996). Metacritic, which uses a weighted average, assigned the film a score of 55 out of 100 based on 55 critics, indicating "mixed or average reviews". Audiences polled by CinemaScore gave the film an average grade of "A–" on an A+ to F scale, while those at PostTrak gave it a 77% positive score, with 61% saying they would definitely recommend it.

Bay's direction was well received by critics. John Nugent of Empire said the filmmaker's "tribute to the emergency services (which involves blowing several of them up) is noisy, messy and frequently absurd — yet still somehow his most gleefully entertaining effort in at least a decade." The Independents Clarisse Loughrey said it was "as exhausting as it is exhilarating, in the way you both expect and desire from a Bay film." Frank Scheck from The Hollywood Reporter and Danny Leigh from Financial Times also described it as "exhausting". While Scheck called it a "decently premised B-movie stretched out to an interminable 136 minutes", Leigh said it was "hard to resist" and that audiences "would miss Bay if he vanished from the Hollywood menagerie." Kevin Maher of The Times wrote, "Everything here is Bay squared. It's a film that simply does not stop."

The story and performances received some criticism. TheWraps Robert Abele said Gyllenhaal's acting was unconvincing and "over-the-top" and that Abdul-Mateen's character was a "poorly conceived good guy in over his head." He also said "Bay's addiction to confusion and pointlessness as operating visual narrative principles keeps this from being in any way pleasurable." A. O. Scott of The New York Times was positive about the performances but found the story predictable, "It all ends up pretty much where you expect it will, but the actors do a good job of seething and emoting under pressure, and Gyllenhaal does a volatile, charming sociopath thing that isn't as annoying as it might be." Tim Grierson, writing for Screen Daily, said the film "spotlights [Bay]'s visual panache alongside his considerable storytelling weaknesses." The Guardians Peter Bradshaw said "Ambulance has everything ... except actors giving a decent performance as believable characters in a workable script." The Evening Standards Charlotte O'Sullivan said the film picks up once the characters enter the ambulance, and that "the B-movie [Gyllenhaal] and Bay have cobbled together is genuinely diverting."

References

External links
 
 
 

2020s chase films
2020s English-language films
2022 action thriller films
2022 crime action films
2022 crime thriller films
Action film remakes
American action thriller films
American chase films
American crime action films
American crime thriller films
American heist films
American remakes of Danish films
Films about bank robbery
Films about brothers
Films about hijackings
Films about the Federal Bureau of Investigation
Films about the Los Angeles Police Department
Films about veterans
Films directed by Michael Bay
Films impacted by the COVID-19 pandemic
Films produced by Ian Bryce
Films produced by James Vanderbilt
Films produced by Michael Bay
Films scored by Lorne Balfe
Films set in Los Angeles
Films shot in Los Angeles
Thriller film remakes
Universal Pictures films
2020s American films